The Regraga are a sub-tribe of the Masmuda Berber tribal confederacy. They are also one of three tribes that formed the population of Essaouira, Morocco.  The Regraga came from the Jbel Hadid mountains and introduced Islam to the region; the other tribes were the Berber Haha and the Chiadma. In Tachelhit, the term Regraga refers to those who are imbued with the spiritual force called Baraka. The tribe became known by this name because in pre-Islamic times they held a prominent religious role in the region, and because of it were considered nobility.

In modern times, the term also refers to a pilgrimage made annually by the Chiadma tribes of the Jbel Hadid and the Haha tribes who live southeast of Essaouira. It takes place in spring and lasts 40 days. During those weeks, pilgrims visit a series of local shrines, from the mouth of the Tensift river south of Safi to the northern outskirts of the High Atlas, including the city of Essaouira itself. They join either of two different groups on a tour of the shrines, stopping at each shrine on the way. One group must adorn at every shrine a holy tent made of fan palm fibres and dyed with henna, the other group arrives in a procession with a muqaddim (religious leader) riding a white horse.

References 

Moroccan tribes
Berbers in Morocco
Masmuda